Dayadara is a village in Bharuch District.

Two villages Dayadara and Bakroli amalgamated into one village called Dayadara.

Schools 
 The Dayadara Higher Secondary School
 Dayadara Kumar (Boys) Shala
 Dayadara Kanya (Girls) Shala

References 

Villages in Bharuch district